Penguin Island is a  island off the coast near Perth, approximately  from Shoalwater. It is home to a colony of approximately 250 little penguins, the largest population of the birds in Western Australia. Since 2007, the island had experienced an 80 percent decline in penguin numbers in 2019 from a peak of 1,700 that year. 

The waters surrounding the island make up the Shoalwater Islands Marine Park.

Transport 
Regular ferries carry tourists to and from the island and other marine-park sights, the journey taking 5 minutes from Mersey point. The island can also be reached by private boat, kayaking, swimming, or walking across a  sandbar, most of which is under varying depths of water. The Department of Parks and Wildlife (DPAW) advises against the sandbar walk, as weather conditions can change quickly making the crossing dangerous, which has resulted in several drownings.

Facilities
There is a picnic area with seating and water taps, and waterless composting toilets on the island.

Litter bins are not provided on the island and all visitors are required to take away their own rubbish. This is to remove potential food sources for destructive animals such as black rats, which have previously led to a reduction in the penguin population. In 2013 a successful baiting program was conducted to eliminate a rat population that had become established on the island.

A discovery centre was built on the island in 1995. In 2021, a new A$3.3 million discovery centre was proposed by the Western Australian Government and originally supported by the City of Rockingham. The building proposal on the island faced local opposition and resulted in the City of Rockingham withdrawing its support in light of the declining penguin numbers and the concerns of the impact of the construction activities on the animals. In August 2022, the WA Government announced that it had abandoned its plans to build the discovery centre on the island. The existing discovery centre will also be demolished and its site rehabilitated.

Natural features 
While the island's little penguins are the island's main attraction, many other nesting and roosting seabirds can be seen including a -strong colony of pelicans.

Penguin Island's varied geographical features include cliffs, small sea caves, headlands, beaches, coves, notches and natural bridges. There are also numerous wave-cut platforms.

Significant areas of Penguin Island include North Rock, Pelican Bluff, North Beach, McKenzies Well, South Beach, Abalone Point, and Surfers Beach.

There are numerous lookouts, boardwalks and walkways throughout most of the island. Some areas are fenced off to the public to protect wildlife and lessen dune erosion.

Penguin Island Board Walk and Walk Trail 
The Penguin Island Walk Trail is a  trail that loops around the island. The walking trail starts at the Penguin Island Discovery Center and includes several lookout points from where some of the terrestrial and marine animals can be observed.

Little penguin colony 
In the 19th and 20th centuries, the penguins of Penguin Island were victims of dog attacks and shooting by holiday-makers. An informal assessment of the Penguin Island colony was made by Vincent Serventy in 1946. After several visits, he estimated the colony to number approximately  pairs. In the 1940s concern was expressed for the viability of the penguin colony on Penguin Island, due to combined threats of human landing parties with guns and dogs, occasional fires, and an abundance of rabbits which were denuding the island of its former vegetation and accelerating its erosion. Rabbits were believed to have been introduced to the island in the 1920s, and numbered approximately four to five thousand in the late 1940s. By 1950, it had become an illegal act to take a dog to Penguin Island.

Penguins were present on Penguin Island in the 1890s, 1900s, 1910s and 1920s. Australian sea lions were also known to haul out on the island around this time.

In the 21st century, spotting wild little penguins at the island is unusual as for most of the year, daylight hours are spent at sea chasing fish, and visitors are strictly prohibited from being on the island except during specified daylight hours from mid-September to early June.

The little penguin population which breeds on Penguin Island is genetically distinct and in decline. In 2007 there were between 1600 and 2000 little penguins on Penguin Island during breeding months. By 2011, the number had dropped to about 1000, and by 2022 to about 250. Penguins have been observed taking longer foraging trips leading to chick malnutrition and starvation. Prey depletion and climate change are considered to be major pressures on the breeding population. A proposal to construct a marina at Point Peron is also considered a future threat.

Little penguins also breed on nearby Garden Island,  to the north. The two colonies are considered as a single meta-population. In 2007, the meta-population was estimated to include a total of 2369 individuals.

Rescued penguins 
A small population of rescued penguins are kept in a dedicated enclosure on the island (known as the Discovery Centre) for visitors to the island to observe. The enclosure was built by the Department of Environment and Conservation in 1987. As well as being a sanctuary to care for injured wild penguins, it is also the home of 10 resident penguins that have been badly injured, orphaned as chicks or born in captivity, and are thus unlikely to survive in the wild. The enclosure has been designed to reflect the natural sandy, coastal scrub environment of the penguins and includes a saltwater pond with viewing panels to watch the little penguins swim. Penguin feedings are held three times daily by a park ranger.

Image gallery

See also
List of islands of Perth, Western Australia

References

Further reading
 Crane, Kevin, Carolyn Thomson and Peter Dans. Discovering Penguin Island and the Shoalwater Islands Marine Park. Como, W.A. Dept. of Conservation and Land Management, 1995.

External links
Shoalwater Islands Marine Park
Rockingham Penguins--Wild Encounters site

Car-free zones in Oceania
City of Rockingham
Islands of the Perth region (Western Australia)
Landmarks in Perth, Western Australia
Shoalwater Marine Park